Luis Rivera Gutierrez (born June 21, 1978) is a Mexican right-handed former Major League Baseball pitcher. He is currently the manager for the Rieleros de Aguascalientes of the Mexican League.

Career
Prior to being signed as an undrafted free agent by the Braves in 1995, he attended Sistema Prepatoria Abierta in Telucha, Mexico.

He began his professional career in 1996 with the GCL Braves, not playing in American baseball in 1995 because he was loaned by the Braves to the Tigres del Mexico. With the GCL Braves in 1996, he went 1–1 with a 2.59 ERA.

In 1997, he pitched for the Danville Braves and Macon Braves, going a combined 5–1 with a 2.03 ERA in 13 games started. In 62 innings of work, he had 84 strikeouts and 24 walks.

Ranked the 44th best prospect in baseball in 1998 by Baseball America, Rivera went 5–5 with a 3.98 ERA for Macon that season. He struck out 118 batters in 92 innings that season.

Rivera was ranked the 71st best prospect in baseball by Baseball America in 1999 and the fourth best prospect in the Braves organization. That year he went 0–2 with a 3.11 ERA in 66 innings. He struck out 81 batters in 66 innings of work.

In 2000, he was ranked the 51st best prospect in baseball and the fifth best prospect in the Braves organization. He began the season on the Braves Opening Day roster, making his big league debut on April 4. He made five relief appearances for the Braves, going 1–0 with a 1.35 ERA in 6 innings of work. He spent time with the GCL Braves and Richmond Braves that year too, going a combined 0–3 with a 6.82 ERA.

On July 31, 2000, he was traded with Trenidad Hubbard and Fernando Lunar to the Orioles for Gabe Molina and B. J. Surhoff. He appeared in only one game for the Orioles, allowing a walk and a hit in 2/3 of an inning. He also appeared in three games with the Rochester Red Wings, going 0–1 with a 3.38 ERA. He played his final big league game on September 20, 2000.

Although he was ranked the fifth best prospect in the Orioles organization in 2001, he did not play at all that year or in 2002. On April 3, 2003, he was released by the Orioles. He has been playing in the Mexican League since then. On June 17, 2009 Rivera signed a minor league contract with the New York Mets, but never pitched for them. In , he appeared in one game for the Dorados de Chihuahua.

References

 Baseball Almanac stats and brief biography

1978 births
Living people
Algodoneros de Guasave players
Atlanta Braves players
Baltimore Orioles players
Baseball players from Chihuahua
Danville Braves players
Dorados de Chihuahua players
Gulf Coast Braves players
Macon Braves players
Major League Baseball pitchers
Major League Baseball players from Mexico
Mexican expatriate baseball players in the United States
Mexican League baseball pitchers
Mexican League baseball managers
Myrtle Beach Pelicans players
Pericos de Puebla players
Richmond Braves players
Rochester Red Wings players
Sultanes de Monterrey players
Tigres de la Angelopolis players
Tomateros de Culiacán players